The Anderson Heat are a World Basketball Association franchise in Anderson, South Carolina. The Anderson Heat were formerly the South Carolina Heat in Greenville, South Carolina. The Heat finished the 2005 season a dismal 8–16, tied for last place in the WBA's Eastern Conference. They are currently on hiatus.

External links
Official Website

World Basketball Association teams
2005 establishments in South Carolina
Basketball teams established in 2005